Leptotrophon spinacutus, also known as Poirieria spinacatus, is a species of sea snail, a marine gastropod mollusk in the family Muricidae, the murex snails or rock snails.

Description
The length of the shell attains 9.5 mm.

Leptotrophon spinacutus was first described as such in a journal of the French National Museum of Natural History (1986) along with six other new species of Muricidae, by the Belgian malacologist Roland Houart.

Distribution
This particular species was found south of the French territory of New Caledonia, 390-400m below sea-level. Houart describes it as having a medium-sized shell for its genus, and being white in color with pale brown blotches. It is covered by a thin white outer layer, the intritacalx (= the chalky outer layer).

References

 Houart R. (1986 ["1985"]). Mollusca Gastropoda: Noteworthy Muricidae from the Pacific Ocean, with description of seven new species. in: Forest, J. (Ed.) Résultats des Campagnes MUSORSTOM I et II Philippines (1976, 1980). Tome 2. Mémoires du Muséum national d'Histoire naturelle. Série A, Zoologie. 133: 427–455

External links
 MNHN, Paris: holotype

Muricidae
Gastropods described in 1986